The Algerian Championnat National 2 season 2009–10 (referred to as the Nedjma Algerian Championnat National 2 for sponsorship reasons) is the sixtieth season of the league under its current title and eighteenth season under its current league division format. It started on 7 August 2009.

League table
A total of 18 teams contest the division, including 14 sides remaining in the division from last season, three relegated from the Algerian Championnat National, and three promoted from the Inter-Régions Ligue.

References

Algerian Ligue 2 seasons
2
Algeria